Ladislav Žižka (born 8 March 1945) is a Czech biathlete. He competed at the 1968 Winter Olympics, the 1972 Winter Olympics and the 1976 Winter Olympics.

References

External links
 

1945 births
Living people
Czech male biathletes
Olympic biathletes of Czechoslovakia
Biathletes at the 1968 Winter Olympics
Biathletes at the 1972 Winter Olympics
Biathletes at the 1976 Winter Olympics
People from Dvůr Králové nad Labem
Sportspeople from the Hradec Králové Region